The International Lunar Research Station (ILRS)  is a planned lunar base currently being developed by Roscosmos and the China National Space Administration (CNSA), with other partners planning to join later on. The ILRS will serve as a comprehensive scientific experiment base built on the lunar surface or in lunar orbit that can carry out multi-disciplinary and multi-objective scientific research activities including exploration and utilization, lunar-based observation, basic scientific experiment and technical verification, and long-term autonomous operation. Statements from Roscosmos and CNSA underline that the project will be "open to all interested countries and international partners."

History 
On 16 June 2021, Roscosmos and the China National Space Administration (CNSA) held a joint session in St. Petersburg on the auspices of the Global Space Exploration Conference (GLEX 2021), dedicated to the presentation of the Roadmap for the creation of the International Lunar Research Station (ILRS). The session was attended by Sergei Saveliev, the Deputy Director General of Roscosmos for International Cooperation and Wu Yanhua, the Vice Administrator of CNSA (remotely).

Roscosmos and CNSA representatives held consultations on a draft declaration in September 2021, together with experts from Germany, France, Italy, the Netherlands, Malaysia, Thailand and the UN Office for Outer Space Affairs. The talks took place behind closed doors.

Definition and composition 
ILRS is a complex experimental research facility to be constructed with a possible attraction of partners on the surface and/or in the orbit of the Moon designed for multi-discipline and multi-purpose scientific research activities, including exploration and use of the Moon, Moon-based observation, fundamental research experiments, and technology verification with the capability of long-term unmanned operation with the prospect of subsequent human presence.

Scientific objectives 
 Lunar topography, geomorphology, and geological structure
 Lunar Physics and internal structure
 Lunar Chemistry (materials and geoarchaeology)
 Cis-Lunar space environment
 Lunar-based astronomical observation
 Lunar based Earth observation
 Lunar-based biological and medical experiment
 Lunar Resource in-situ utilization

Facilities 
 Cislunar Transportation Facility – supporting round-trip transfers between the Earth and the Moon, including lunar descent, landing, ascent, and return to Earth.
 Long-term Support Facility on Lunar Surface – to consist of various support modules for operations on the lunar surface.
 Lunar Transportation and Operation Facility – to consist of modules for lunar exploration and cargo transportation.
 Lunar Scientific Facility – to support in-orbit and surface experiments
 Ground Support and Application Facility – data center and ground support operations

Development

Phase 1: Reconnaissance (2021–2025) 
Objectives:
 Lunar reconnaissance with the planned missions
 ILRS design and selection of site(s)
 Technology verification for a secure high-precision soft landing

Planned Missions 
Most missions that are planned in the reconnaissance era weren't specifically planned for the ILRS, with some being planned far back into the 90's. However, their reconnaissance can still prove useful to the overall mission.

Chang'e 4 
Chang'e 4 was a soft landing on the far side of the Moon, Launched on the 7th of December, 2018, entering Lunar Orbit on 12 of December, 2022, as a part of China's own Chinese Lunar Exploration Program. While not specifically made for the Research Station, as it was a backup module for its predecessor, Chang'e 3. However, it has still helped with Reconnaissance for the mission as a whole, a theme for most reconnaissance missions for the Research Station.

Luna 25 
Luna 25 is a planned mission to the Moon by Roscosmos to deliver 30 kg of scientific payloads and instruments to the surface of the Moon, it also was not planned specifically for the Research Station, with planning going back all the way to 90's.

Luna 26 
Luna 26 is a planned lunar polar orbiter. Along with the scientific payload that it carries, it would allow for a telecom array for landed Russian assets, and Earth. The Mission was announced in November 2022, and it has a launch plan for 2024. It will study the lunar surface along with carrying foreign payloads from NASA, and the ESA. It will also do some reconnaissance for the future Luna 27.

Phase 2: Construction (2026–2035) 
Stage 1 (2026–2030):
 Technology verification for the command center of ILRS
 Lunar sample return
 Massive cargo delivery and secure high-precision soft landing
 Start of joint operations

Stage 2 (2031–2035):
 Establishment of in-orbit and surface facilities for the ILRS, in preparation for crewed missions.

Phase 3: Utilization (from 2036) 
Objectives:
 Lunar research, exploration, and technology verification
 Supporting crewed lunar missions with the completed ILRS
 Expanding and maintaining modules as needed

See also
 Chinese Lunar Exploration Program
 Luna-Glob
 Moonbase
 Colonization of the Moon

References

Russian lunar exploration program
Chinese Lunar Exploration Program